Priming may refer to:

 Priming (agriculture), a form of seed planting preparation, in which seeds are soaked before planting
 Priming (immunology), a process occurring when a specific antigen is presented to naive lymphocytes causing them to differentiate either into armed effector cells or into memory cells
 Priming (media), a cognitive process in which media information increases temporarily the accessibility of knowledge units in the memory of an individual
 Priming (microbiology), the effect that nutrients have on the rate of organic matter decomposition.
 Priming (psychology), a process in which the processing of a target stimulus is aided or altered by the presentation of a previously presented stimulus
 Priming (steam locomotive), a harmful condition in which water is carried over from the boiler of a steam locomotive
 Priming (structural) in psycholinguistics, a form of positive priming that induces a tendency to repeat or more easily process a sentence that is similar in structure to one previously presented
 Priming beta-ketosynthase in chemistry, a domain of polyketide synthases with a thiol group on a cysteine side-chain
 The process by which a pump is filled with fluid and made able to operate
 Priming the pump or economic stimulus, attempts to use monetary or fiscal policy to stimulate the economy
 Priming sugar or glucose, a simple monosaccharide found in plants

See also
 Primer (disambiguation)
 Intertrial priming (psychology)
 Response priming (psychology)
 Negative priming (psychology)